Pipewell Woods is an  biological Site of Special Scientific Interest south-west of Corby in Northamptonshire. It is composed of Pipewell Wood itself, Little Haws Wood, Foxhole Wood, Barrowdykes Wood, Monk's Arbour Wood and Rawhaw Wood. It is a Nature Conservation Review site, Grade 2.

The woods are an example of wet ash-maple woodland both in its typical form and a nationally rare one. It has diverse flora including the locally rare giant bellflower, herb paris and wood speedwell. Open grassy areas provide additional habitats for birds and insects.

A road and a public footpath from Pipewell go through the site.

References

Sites of Special Scientific Interest in Northamptonshire
Nature Conservation Review sites